Jess is a given name and a surname. It may also refer to:

 Jess (falconry), the strap that tethers a hawk or falcon
 Jess (programming language)
 Jess (novel), by H. Rider Haggard
 JESS (Joint Expert Speciation System), chemistry software

See also
 Jes (disambiguation)